Alexandra Elizabeth Kingston (born 11 March 1963) is an English actress. Active from the early 1980s, Kingston became noted for her television work in both Britain and the US in the 1990s, including her regular role as Dr. Elizabeth Corday in the NBC medical drama ER (1997–2004) and her title role in the ITV miniseries The Fortunes and Misfortunes of Moll Flanders (1996), which earned her a BAFTA nomination for Best Actress.

Kingston's later credits include the recurring role of River Song in the BBC science fiction series Doctor Who (2008–2015), Mrs. Bennet in the ITV period-drama fantasy Lost in Austen (2008), Dinah Lance in The CW's superhero fiction drama series Arrow (2013–2016), and Sarah Bishop in A Discovery of Witches (2018–2022).

Early life
Kingston was born and brought up in Epsom, Surrey, to Anthony Kingston, an English butcher and his German wife, Margarethe (née Renneisen). Kingston's paternal great-great-grandmother was Jewish, an ancestry Kingston explored on the series Who Do You Think You Are? Kingston's uncle, her mother's younger brother, is actor Walter Renneisen. Her younger sisters are Susie, who is mentally and physically disabled as a result of being deprived of oxygen at birth, and Nicola, a former actress who appeared in the 1996 British TV production of The Fortunes and Misfortunes of Moll Flanders, in which Kingston starred.

Kingston was inspired to pursue acting by one of her teachers at Rosebery School for Girls. Kingston auditioned and performed in the Surrey County Youth Theatre production of Tom Jones as Mrs Fitzpatrick, alongside Sean Pertwee as Captain Fitzpatrick and Thwackum played by Tom Davison. She later completed a three-year programme at the Royal Academy of Dramatic Art and went on to join the Royal Shakespeare Company.

Career

1980–2007: Early career and breakthrough with ER 
In 1980, Kingston made her television debut in three episodes of the children's soap opera Grange Hill, while also appearing as an uncredited extra in the film The Wildcats of St Trinian's. From the mid-eighties to the mid-nineties, she performed on stage in twenty different theatrical productions, working extensively with the Birmingham Repertory Theatre and the Royal Shakespeare Company. Her classic Shakespearean roles included Calpurnia in Julius Caesar (1987), Cordelia in King Lear (1990), Hero in Much Ado About Nothing (1990–1991), Titania in A Midsummer Night's Dream (1992) and Desdemona in Othello (1993).

Around the same time, she could be seen playing small parts in television shows like A Killing on the Exchange (1987), Hannay (1989), Covington Cross (1992), Soldier Soldier (1993) and Crocodile Shoes (1994), and also had various guest roles in ITV's long-running police procedural The Bill (1988–1995). In film, she appeared in The Cook, the Thief, His Wife & Her Lover (1989) with Helen Mirren, The Infiltrator (1995) with Oliver Platt and Carrington (1995) with Emma Thompson, where she played writer Frances Partridge.

In April 1996, she got her first regular television role as customs officer Katherine Roberts in the ITV crime drama The Knock, appearing in all thirteen episodes of the second series. In December, she played the lead role opposite Daniel Craig in The Fortunes and Misfortunes of Moll Flanders, an ITV adaptation of Daniel Defoe's novel Moll Flanders. She received a nomination for Best Actress for her performance at the following year's British Academy Television Awards.In September 1997, Kingston gained North American television fame after being cast as a main character in the long-running medical drama ER. She made her first appearance as British surgeon Elizabeth Corday in the premiere of the fourth season, the Emmy Award-winning live episode "Ambush". Having appeared in the show for just over seven seasons, she left it in October 2004, in the eleventh-season episode "Fear", after her contract was not renewed. Being 41 at the time, she criticised the move as ageism, stating that "apparently, I, according to the producers and the writers, am part of the old fogies who are no longer interesting." Despite that, she said that she was "very proud of the work [she had] done over the past eight years" and "grateful for the professional associations and friendships [she had] made through ER".

The ER role helped propel Kingston's career to new heights, which led to a number of big-screen appearances in films like the Clive Owen neo-noir drama Croupier (1998) and independent period drama Sweet Land (2005), as well as the crime dramas Essex Boys (2000) and Alpha Dog (2006). In 2003, she battled Romans as the warrior queen of Britain in ITV's biopic Boudica, which was also released in the USA on PBS under the title Warrior Queen and marked the screen debut of Emily Blunt.

In November 2005, Kingston guest starred as a vacationer whose husband gets kidnapped by a Mexican street gang in an episode of the CBS crime drama Without a Trace, titled "Viuda Negra" and directed by her former ER co-star Paul McCrane. The following year, she returned to the stage after ten years in the West End production of One Flew Over the Cuckoo's Nest, starring as Nurse Ratched opposite Christian Slater as Randle McMurphy. She then revealed that she auditioned for the role of Lynette Scavo on ABC's Desperate Housewives but was turned away for being too curvy.

2008–present: Doctor Who and further television work 
In 2008, Kingston guest starred as Professor River Song in the fourth series of the BBC's long-running science fiction television series Doctor Who, in the two-part story "Silence in the Library" / "Forest of the Dead", starring David Tennant as the Tenth Doctor. She thought it was simply a one-off guest role but was delighted to find out that she would be a returning character after the story's writer, Steven Moffat, succeeded Russell T Davies as the Doctor Who showrunner. She reprised the role in thirteen episodes between 2010 and 2015, appearing on screen opposite two more incarnations of the Doctor played by Matt Smith and Peter Capaldi. Kingston has also portrayed the role in a number of audio dramas from Big Finish Productions, including her solo series The Diary of River Song (2015–present).

In September 2008, Kingston took the part of Mrs. Bennet in ITV's acclaimed four-part drama Lost in Austen, based on Jane Austen's novel  Pride and Prejudice. In October, she appeared in the episode "Art Imitates Life" of the police procedural drama CSI: Crime Scene Investigation as psychiatrist and grief counsellor Patricia Alwick, who helped the team cope with the recent death of one of their members.

In both 2009 and 2010, Kingston had recurring roles as MI6 agent Fiona Banks in the ABC science fiction drama FlashForward and defence attorney Miranda Pond in the NBC legal drama Law & Order: Special Victims Unit, in which she reunited with her former ER castmates, Mariska Hargitay and Maria Bello. In spring 2009, Kingston returned to ER itself during its fifteenth and final season for two episodes, "Dream Runner" and the two-hour series finale, "And in the End...". In June, she starred as the lead character Ellie Lagden, one of four former convicts, in the BBC One eight-part drama series Hope Springs.

In the early 2010s, Kingston played a housewife in the five-part supernatural drama Marchlands (2011), an archaeologist in the second series of the revived Upstairs Downstairs (2012) and an analyst working for a missing persons unit in the four-part crime drama Chasing Shadows (2014). In the US, she appeared in the romantic film Like Crazy (2011) and the Grey's Anatomy spin-off series Private Practice (2011), in the guest role of a psychiatrist writing book reviews. She also starred in the first season of The CW's superhero drama series Arrow (2013) as Professor Dinah Lance, the mother of Laurel and Sara Lance, and later reprised the role in a few episodes over the next three seasons. On stage, she participated in the Donmar Warehouse production of Friedrich Schiller's play Luise Miller (2011), directed by Michael Grandage.

In July 2013, she played Lady Macbeth opposite Kenneth Branagh in the Manchester International Festival's production of Macbeth, which was broadcast live in cinemas worldwide as part of the National Theatre Live programme. Following a nomination for Best Actress at the Manchester Theatre Awards, she reprised her role with Branagh at the Park Avenue Armory in June 2014, making her New York stage debut. Earlier in April, Branagh and Kingston took other classic Shakespearean lead roles in the two-and-a-half-hour adaptation of Antony and Cleopatra, broadcast on BBC Radio 3 as part of its celebration of the 450th anniversary of Shakespeare's birth.

During the late 2010s, she took a prominent role as Sarah Bishop in Sky's fantasy drama A Discovery of Witches (2018–2022), while also appearing in shows like Gilmore Girls: A Year in the Life (2016), Shoot the Messenger (2016) and The Widow (2019). In 2021, she wrote a River Song novel called Doctor Who: The Ruby's Curse for BBC Books, and reprised the role for pre-recorded elements of the interactive theatrical experience Time Fracture. The following year, she starred as the villainous Lucifer in an episode of the Oliver Twist-inspired children's television series Dodger, also starring the Ninth Doctor actor, Christopher Eccleston.

In September 2022, it was announced that she will return to the Royal Shakespeare Company for the first time since the early nineties in the role of Prospero in The Tempest.

Personal life
Kingston met English actor Ralph Fiennes while they were both students at the Royal Academy of Dramatic Art. They were together for ten years before marrying in 1993. In 1995, Fiennes began an affair with his Hamlet co-star Francesca Annis and left Kingston the following year; they were divorced in 1997. In a 2006 interview, she admitted to considering and nearly attempting suicide after her separation from Fiennes.

At the end of 1998, Kingston married Florian Haertel, a German writer and freelance journalist, having met him the previous year on a blind date arranged by friends; they had a daughter, Salome Violetta Haertel, born 28 March 2001. Kingston and Haertel separated in 2009. On 30 October 2009, Haertel sued Kingston for dissolution of the marriage, and the divorce was finalised in 2013.

Kingston appeared on the BBC genealogy series Who Do You Think You Are? in September 2012, investigating the lives of her great-grandfather Will Keevil and her four-times great-grandmother, Elizabeth Braham. 

In 2015, Kingston married Jonathan Stamp, a television producer in an Italian ceremony.

Kingston has lived in the United States, and moved back to the UK in 2019.

Filmography

Film

Television

Radio

Audio

Video games

Stage work

Awards and nominations

Bibliography
Novels
 Doctor Who: The Ruby's Curse (2021)

References

External links

 

1963 births
Living people
20th-century English actresses
21st-century English actresses
Actresses from Surrey
Alumni of RADA
British expatriate actresses in the United States
English Shakespearean actresses
English expatriates in the United States
English film actresses
English people of German descent
English people of Jewish descent
English stage actresses
English television actresses
English video game actresses
English voice actresses
National Youth Theatre members
Outstanding Performance by an Ensemble in a Drama Series Screen Actors Guild Award winners
People from Epsom
Royal Shakespeare Company members
Audiobook narrators